Valcheta Airport  is a public airport located  south-southeast of Valcheta, Río Negro, Argentina.

Google Maps shows the runways and taxiways taken over by brush and scrub.

See also

Transport in Argentina
List of airports in Argentina
Talk:Valcheta Airport

References

External links 
OpenStreetMap - Valcheta Airport
Airport record for Valcheta Airport at Landings.com

Defunct airports
Airports in Argentina
Río Negro Province